The Ministry of Education (ME) of Argentina is a ministry of the national executive power that oversees education policies on all educational levels, alongside the governments of the twenty-three provinces of Argentina and the City of Buenos Aires.

The Ministry was founded in 1949, when the state's education portfolio was split from the Ministry of Justice and Public Instruction in the first cabinet of President Juan Domingo Perón; the first minister was Oscar Ivanissevich. The current minister is Jaime Perczyk, who has served since 20 September 2021 in the cabinet of President Alberto Fernández.

The ministry is headquartered at the Sarmiento Palace, popularly known as "Pizzurno Palace" due to its location on Pasaje Pizzurno, in  the Buenos Aires neighbourhood of Recoleta.

List of ministers

References

External links
 

Education
Education in Argentina
Argentina
1949 establishments in Argentina